Katrina Adams and Debbie Graham were the defending champions but did not compete that year.

Amanda Coetzer and Alexandra Fusai won in the final 6–3, 6–1 against Eva Martincová and Elena Wagner.

Seeds
Champion seeds are indicated in bold text while text in italics indicates the round in which those seeds were eliminated.

 Amanda Coetzer /  Alexandra Fusai (champions)
 Mariaan de Swardt /  Ruxandra Dragomir (semifinals)
 Eva Martincová /  Elena Wagner (final)
 Rachel McQuillan /  Silke Meier (quarterfinals)

Draw

External links
 1997 Budapest Lotto Open Doubles Draw

Budapest Grand Prix
1997 WTA Tour